Ambarès-et-Lagrave (Ambarés e La Grava in Gascon dialect) is a commune in the Gironde department in the Nouvelle-Aquitaine region of southwestern France.

The inhabitants of the commune are known as Ambarésiens or Ambarésiennes

Geography
Ambarès-et-Lagrave is part of the Bordeaux urban area located to the north of the Bordeaux conurbation between the Garonne and Dordogne. The A10 autoroute passes down the eastern side of the commune from north to south with Exit  → Ambarès-et-Lagrave, Saint-Loubès in the commune. The commune is mostly urban with small areas of forest in the north and south and farmland in the west and north.

Ambarès-et-Lagrave is part of the Bordeaux Métropole.

Transport
TER Aquitaine
The commune is served by two  railway stations: the Grave-d'Ambarès station and La Gorp station which have regular links with Bordeaux.

TBC Network

Trans Gironde Network

Neighbouring communes and villages

History
In the 12th century the city of Ambarès belonged to a vast feudal domain comprising a large part of the marshes of Entre-deux-Mers (Between two seas). Later this area became the Barony of Montferrand.

The ancient parish of Ambarès was almost entirely under the jurisdiction of the Lords of Gua who levied tithes from the 15th century.

The Lagrave district was attached to the commune of Ambarès in 1818.

Heraldry

Administration

List of Successive Mayors

Twinning

Ambarès-et-Lagrave has twinning associations with:
 Kelheim (Bavaria, Germany) since 1989.
 Midsomer Norton (Somerset, UK) since 1985.

Demography
In 2017 the commune had 16,344 inhabitants. The population of Ambarès-et-Lagrave has more than doubled between 1962 and 1999. This significant increase in the population is probably due to its proximity to the city of Bordeaux.

Economy
Although the tertiary sector (services) is predominant in Ambarès-et-Lagrave, the town also has many jobs in industry (secondary sector).

Allocation of Workers (2009, INSEE):

Unemployment rate: 9.8% (2009, INSEE)

Culture and heritage

Civil heritage
The commune has many buildings and structures that are registered as historical monuments:
A Lavoir (Public Laundry) at La Gorp (1893)
The Château Beauséjour (19th century) was probably rebuilt in the middle of the 19th century but as farm buildings it may be older. The old house was listed as Pouyau on the Belleyme map and in the old Land Registry.
The Château du Tillac (17th century) was the noble house of the Joly de Bonneau family. It was probably built in the 17th century perhaps at the site of an old house as it is located on one of the peaks at the end the peninsula.
The Chauvette House at 10 Rue de la Commanderie des Templiers (18th century)
A House at 27 Rue Edmond-Faulat (20th century)
A House at 6-8 Rue Edmond-Faulat (19th century)
The Charron House at 9 Rue Edmond-Faulat (17th century)
The Château de Formont (19th century) was a former noble house on one of the peaks of the end of the peninsula and is shown on the Belleyme map. The building may have been built in the early 18th century as indicated by the date it bore of 1723 which is now destroyed.
The Café Duthil at 11 Avenue de la Gare (19th century)
A House at 7 Rue Guillaume-Peychaud (18th century)
The Château du Gua (1866) was a former noble house of the Laroque, Donissan, and Pineau families. It was known early in the 15th century and mentioned on the Belleyme map. The house was completely destroyed and rebuilt in 1866.
The Le Gaès Farmhouse at 22 Avenue de la Libération (18th century)
The Rousseau House at 61 Avenue de la Libération (18th century)
A Wine Warehouse at 69 bis Avenue de la Libération (1837)
The former Covered Market / Town Hall at the Place du Maréchal-Leclerc (1836)
The Château Saint-Denis (17th century) was perhaps an ancient noble house but not listed as such on the Belleyme map. Probably built in the 17th century for the Pineau family according to a U-shaped plan (as amended). It was the property of the actor Louis Jouvet in 1930.
The Château Peychaud (17th century) was a lordship documented since the 16th century belonging to the Fayet family. The old castle was probably rebuilt in 1680 and in the early 18th century when it included the current building flanked to the north by agricultural areas.
The Château Bellevue (19th century) was probably rebuilt in the middle of the 19th century on the site of a former U-shaped house mentioned as Puymanot on the Belleyme map and the old Land Registry. It has been converted into a school since 1980.
The Château Durandeau (19th century) was a former noble house of the Rishon family shown on the Belleyme map. The building may have been built in the 17th century and rebuilt in the 18th century then extensively restored in the middle of the 19th century.
The Le Grain House at 32 Avenue du Roy (18th century)
The Beaujet House at 83 Avenue du Roy (18th century)
The Town Hall / School at Place de la Victoire (19th century)
The War Memorial at Place de la Victoire (1921)
A Monumental Column at Rue de la Vierge (1885)
Mills (18th century)
Winemakers' Huts (19th-20th century)
Houses, Manors, and Farms (18th-20th century)
Montferrand Marsh (17th century)

Religious heritage
The commune has several religious sites that are registered as historical monuments:
The Parish Church of Saint Pierre (11th century) The church contains a large number of items that are registered as historical objects.
The Chapel of Saint Denis (19th century)
The Cemetery at Rue Victor-Hugo (19th century)
The Presbytery at 3 Rue Victor-Hugo (18th century)
The former Church of the Templars Notre-Dame-de-la-Grave at Rue de la Vierge (12th century)
Monumental Crosses (19th century)

Picture Gallery

Sports
The Ambarésienne Sports Association (ASA) was founded in 1970 and is a sports association affiliated with the French Federation of Omnisports Clubs (FFCO). Its purpose is to provide sport for all. The ASA had more than 2,500 members and 23 sections in 2012.

Notable people linked to the commune
Members of the musical group Noir Désir recorded part of their debut album at Ambarès near La Blanche (water point) and one of the members of the group lives in Ambarès.
André Lignac, born in Ambarès and was deputy mayor of the town for over 50 years.
Marc Oraison (1914-1979), born in Ambarès, priest and doctor.

See also
Communes of the Gironde department

References

External links
Ambarès-et-Lagrave official website 
Ambarès-et-Lagrave on the old National Geographic Institute website 
Ambarésienne Sports Association official website 
Ambarès-et-Lagrave on Géoportail, National Geographic Institute (IGN) website 
Ambares and la Grave on the 1750 Cassini Map

Communes of Gironde